The 1908 United States presidential election in Florida was held on November 3, 1908. Voters chose five representatives, or electors to the Electoral College, who voted for President and Vice-President.

Background
With the disenfranchisement of African-Americans by a poll tax in 1889, Florida become a one-party Democratic state, which it was to remain until the 1950s, apart from the anti-Catholic vote against Al Smith in 1928. Unlike southern states extending into the Appalachian Mountains or Ozarks, or Texas with its German settlements in the Edwards Plateau, Florida completely lacked upland or German refugee whites opposed to secession. Thus Florida's Republican Party between 1872 and 1888 was entirely dependent upon black votes, a fact is graphically seen when one considers that – although very few blacks in Florida had ever voted within the previous fifty-five years – at the time of the landmark court case of Smith v. Allwright, half of Florida's registered Republicans were still black. Thus disfranchisement of blacks and poor whites left Florida as devoid of Republican adherents as Louisiana, Mississippi, or South Carolina.

Nevertheless, Florida's one-party Democratic rule was to be marginally interrupted in the 1900s by considerable Socialist and Populist growth, centered in Tampa and Jacksonville, and southern Lee County with its "Koreshan Unity" sect Immigrants and farmers fearing loss of tenure were able to give Eugene Debs, in the second of his five Presidential runs, over ten percent of the vote in several counties of South Florida, and Populist Thomas E. Watson substantial votes in many pineywoods counties.

1908 saw several major strikes in the state, notably of railcars in Pensacola, and Debs was able to improve upon his 1904 vote to the extent of running second in five counties. However, Bryan still carried the state by a three-to-one margin over his nearest rival.

Results

Results by county

Notes

References 

1908
Florida
1908 Florida elections